The Phoenix is an album from Canadian singer Raghav as a follow-up to his first two albums Storyteller in 2004 and Identity in 2009. The album was released in Canada on April 10, 2012, on the Cordova Bay label. Four singles were released from the album: "So Much" featuring Kardinal Offishal, then "Kya Se Kya Ho Gaya", a Hindi track, then "Fire" and "Top of the World".

Track listing

References

2012 albums
Raghav albums
Albums produced by Labrinth